Done the Impossible is a 2006 documentary film on the fan following for Firefly. Its focus is on how fans came to love the show and played a part in the production of its feature film continuation Serenity.

History
The title is taken from a line of dialogue, spoken by Malcolm Reynolds in the pilot episode of Firefly. In context, it referred to the Independents' achievement of (temporarily) holding Serenity Valley against the Alliance: "We have done the impossible, and that makes us mighty."

Cast
Adam Baldwin serves as host with  Jewel Staite doing a voice-over, and has interviews with cast, crew and numerous fans.

Firefly Actors
 Nathan Fillion
 Alan Tudyk 
 Christina Hendricks 
 Jewel Staite
 Morena Baccarin
 Ron Glass

 Firefly Production
 Joss Whedon
 Tim Minear

Authors
 Orson Scott Card 
 Keith R.A. DeCandido
 Tracy Hickman
 Margaret Weis

Others
 Mary Parent (Universal Pictures)
 Christopher Buchanan (Producer on Serenity)
 Greg Edmonson
 Loni Peristere 
 Rafael Feldman
 Yan Feldman
 James Gunn
 Jenna Fischer
 John Cassaday

Release
The film was released as a DVD with more than five hours of additional interviews, as well as various bonus features. The main feature was also released as a torrent under a noncommercial Creative Commons license.

Reception
IGN Reviewer Eric Goldman noted "It's fun to see the interviews and the joy the show has brought to many.... The extras are well done and informative, in some ways doing a much better job than the documentary of presenting facts about the series to a novice, who doesn't know a Companion from an Operative."

Adam Arseneau of DVD Verdict describes it as "the ultimate expression of fanboy love" and explains that the film is more about the fan community than a documentary about Firefly itself. He warns "this one is for fans only. Even then, it's a bit obsessive at times." but as a fan himself he enjoyed it.

Soundtrack

 Track listing
 "Done the Impossible (Ballad of Serenity)" - Rob Kuhlman
 "Autumn in Asheville" (Instrumental) - Emerald Rose
 "Gwydion's Song To Lleu" (Instrumental) - Emerald Rose
 "The Fall of Serenity Valley" - Brobdingnagian Bards
 "Take Me Down (To Her Water)" - Emerald Rose
 "Urania Sings" (Instrumental) - Emerald Rose
 "Deventure" - Vitulari
 "Big Damn Heroes" (Instrumental) - Emerald Rose
 "Firefly Main Title (The Ballad of Serenity)" - Emerald Rose
 "Big Damn Trilogy" (Instrumental) - The Bedlam Bards
 "Come to the Dance" (Instrumental) - Emerald Rose
 "Sail the Sky" (Instrumental) - The Bedlam Bards
 "The Rock Garden" - The Bedlam Bards
 "I'm Gonna See Serenity" - Dan Sehane
 "Big Damn Trilogy" - The Bedlam Bards
 "Mal's Song" - Michelle Dockrey
 "Big Damn Heroes" - Emerald Rose
 "The Ballad of Lux" - The Bedlam Bards
 "Mal's Song" (Instrumental) - Tony Fabris
 "Done the Impossible" (Ballad of Serenity) (Instrumental) - Rob Kuhlman

References

 Done the Impossible: The Fans' Tale of Firefly & Serenity (2006), DVD, UPC 822732036221

External links
 Official site
 
 eFilmCritic Review
 LethalDeath Review Archive copy

2006 films
American documentary films
Fan films
Firefly (franchise)
American independent films
Documentary films about television
Documentary films about fandom
2006 documentary films
2006 independent films
2000s English-language films
2000s American films

fr:Done the Impossible